ceSergio Martini (born 29 July 1949) is an Italian mountaineer. In 2000, he became the seventh person to climb the fourteen eight-thousanders (and the second Italian after Reinhold Messner) having done so during 1983–2000.

References

Summiters of all 14 eight-thousanders
1949 births
Living people